Vaskidovich Ridge (‘Vaskidovich Rid’ \va-'ski-do-vich 'rid\) is the mostly ice-covered ridge extending 4.6 km in east-west direction and 1.5 km wide, rising to 1518 m at its east extremity, situated on the west side of Rouen Mountains in northern Alexander Island, Antarctica. The ridge surmounts Nichols Snowfield to the west-southwest. It was visited on 28 January 1988 by the geological survey team of Christo Pimpirev and Borislav Kamenov (First Bulgarian Antarctic Expedition), and Philip Nell and Peter Marquis (British Antarctic Survey).

The feature is named after the Bulgarian National Revival enlightener Emanuil Vaskidovich (1795-1875).

Location
British mapping in 1971.

Maps
 British Antarctic Territory. Scale 1:200000 topographic map. DOS 610 – W 69 70. Tolworth, UK, 1971
 Antarctic Digital Database (ADD). Scale 1:250000 topographic map of Antarctica. Scientific Committee on Antarctic Research (SCAR). Since 1993, regularly upgraded and updated

Notes

References
 Bulgarian Antarctic Gazetteer. Antarctic Place-names Commission. (details in Bulgarian, basic data in English)
 Vaskidovich Ridge. SCAR Composite Gazetteer of Antarctica

External links
 Vaskidovich Ridge. Copernix satellite image

Mountains of Alexander Island
Bulgaria and the Antarctic